Nationality words link to articles with information on the nation's poetry or literature (for instance, Irish or France).

Events

Works published in English

Canada
 Jean Blewett, Heart Songs
 Bliss Carman, Ballads of Lost Haven: A Book of the Sea, Canadian author published in the United States
 William Henry Drummond, The Habitant and Other French-Canadian Poems, employing dialect
 Frederick George Scott, The Unnamed Lake and Other Poems

United Kingdom
 Alfred Austin, The Conversion of Winkelmann, and Other Poems
 Hilaire Belloc, More Beasts (for Worse Children) (see The Bad Child's Book of Beasts 1896)
 Mary Elizabeth Coleridge, publishing under the pen name "Anodos", Fancy's guerdon (see also Fancy's Following 1896)
 John Davidson, New Ballads
 Ernest Dowson, The Pierrot of the Minute: A dramatic phantasy
 Lionel Johnson, Ireland, with Other Poems
 Henry Newbolt, Admirals All, and Other Verses, including "Vitaï Lampada", and "Drake's Drum" (first published in the St. John's Gazette 1896)
 George William Russell, publishing under the pen name "Æ", The Earth Breath, and Other Poems
 Dora Sigerson, The Fairy Changeling, and Other Poems
 Arthur Symons, Amoris Victima
 Francis Thompson, New Poems
 Theodore Watts-Dunton, The Coming of Love

United States
 Richard Maurice Burke, Walt Whitman: Man and Poet, nonfiction
 Bliss Carman, Ballads of Lost Haven: A Book of the Sea, Canadian author published in the United States
 James Whitcomb Riley, Neighborly Poems
 Edwin Arlington Robinson, The Children of the Night, including "Reuben Bright"
 John B. Tabb, Lyrics
 Yone Noguchi, Seen and Unseen, or, Monologues of a Homeless Snail and The Voice of the Valley

Other in English
 John Le Gay Brereton, Sweetheart Mine: Lyrics of Love and Friendship, Australia
 G. Sigerson, editor and translator from Gaelic, Bards of Gael and Gall, Ireland
 Isaac Tambyah, editor, A Garland of Ceylon Verse 1837-1897, Colombo: Ceylon Printing Works, 132 pages; anthology; Indian poetry in English

Works published in other languages

France
 Francis Jammes, La Naissance du poète ("The Birth of the Poet")
 Stéphane Mallarmé:
 Divagations
 Un Coup de dés jamais n'abolira le hasard ("A Throw of the Dice will Never Abolish Chance") is published in Cosmopolis magazine (not published in book form until 1914)
 Edmond Rostand, Cyrano de Bergerac, a verse drama

Other languages
 Stefan George, Das Jahr der Seele ("The Year of the Soul"); German

Awards and honors

Births
 August 11 – Louise Bogan (died 1970), American poet and critic; wife of Raymond Holden
 May 5 – Kenneth Burke (died 1993), major American literary theorist and philosopher
 October 10 – Shigeji Tsuboi 壺井繁治 (died 1975), Japanese poet (surname: Tsuboi)
 November 7 – Ruth Pitter (died 1992), English poet and decorative painter (born Emma Thomas Pitter)
 November 11 – Nima Yooshij (died 1960), Persian poet
 November 15 – Sir Sacheverell Sitwell (died 1988), English writer, best known as an art critic and writer on architecture, particularly the baroque; younger brother of Dame Edith Sitwell and Sir Osbert Sitwell
 John Ferrar Holms (died 1934), British critic

Deaths
Birth years link to the corresponding "[year] in poetry" article:
 May 4 — Isabella Banks (born 1821), English poet and novelist
 July 20 — Jean Ingelow (born 1829), English poet and novelist
 September 14 — James Joseph Sylvester (born 1814), English mathematician who translated poetry from the original French, German, Italian, Latin and Greek; author of The Laws of Verse, in which he attempted to codify a set of laws for prosody in poetry
 December 22 – William Gay, (born 1865), Scots-born Australian poet
 date not known – Velutteri Keshavan Vaidyar (born 1839), Indian, Malayalam-language poet

See also

 19th century in poetry
 19th century in literature
 List of years in poetry
 List of years in literature
 Victorian literature
 French literature of the 19th century
 Symbolist poetry
 Young Poland (Młoda Polska) a modernist period in Polish  arts and literature, roughly from 1890 to 1918
 Poetry

Notes

19th-century poetry
Poetry